The enzyme citrate lyase deacetylase (EC 3.1.2.16) catalyzes the reaction

acetyl-[citrate (pro-3S)-lyase] + H2O = holo-[citrate (pro-3S)-lyase] + acetate

This enzyme belongs to the family of hydrolases, specifically those acting on thioester bonds.  The systematic name is acetyl-[citrate-(pro-3S)-lyase] hydrolase. This enzyme is also called [citrate-(pro-3S)-lyase] thiolesterase.

References

 

EC 3.1.2
Enzymes of unknown structure